Barbara Baker is an American plant molecular geneticist working at the University of California, Berkeley and the United States Department of Agriculture  She was elected to the National Academy of Sciences in 2021.

Education and career 
Baker graduated from Los Alamitos High School in 1970 and completed her undergraduate studies at UC San Diego in 1974. She went on to earn her PhD at UC San Francisco with J. Michael Bishop and Harold E. Varmus in 1981, and did postdoctoral research in Germany. As of 2021, Baker is an adjunct professor at the University of California, Berkeley and a senior scientist at the United States Department of Agriculture.

Research 
Baker is a plant geneticist working on plant innate immunity, the mechanism by which plants protect themself from diseases. Baker's research includes cloning the N gene for resistance to Tobacco mosaic virus, which was one of the first plant disease resistance genes cloned. She is also known for her research on R-genes and their role as a defense system against plant pathogens. Baker has also examined the genetic conditions behind the susceptibility to disease in tomatoes, potatoes, and the flowering plants in the genus Solanum.

Selected publications

Awards 
Elected member, National Academy of Sciences (2021)

References

External links
 

Living people
Year of birth missing (living people)
American molecular biologists
American geneticists
University of California, San Diego alumni
University of California, San Francisco alumni
University of California, Berkeley faculty
Members of the United States National Academy of Sciences
Plant geneticists
American women geneticists
21st-century American women scientists
Scientists from California
21st-century American biologists
Women molecular biologists